Senegal is subdivided into four levels of administrative divisions.

Regions 

At the top level are the Regions of Senegal and their elected administrative body. The 14 regions (régions, singular - région), are administered by a Conseil Régionaux, which is elected by population weight at the Arrondissement level.

Departments 

Regions are subdivided into Departments, which are strictly administrative entities with no independent political power.

Arrondissements 

Departments are made up of Arrondissements. These are also purely administrative structures, with prefects appointed by the central government.

Communes 

City arrondissements (such as in Dakar and Pikine) are divided into Communes d'arrondissement. In the Dakar Region, since 1996, the four Arrondissements have been subdivided into such Communes d'arrondissement, with appointed Sub-Prefects, answerable to their Arrondissement Prefects. Outside the large cities, the  built up areas are titled communes de ville and the rural arrondissements divided into communautés rurales  which maintain the same powers: city councils and mayors, directly elected. 

Senegal's subdivisions number 14 régions, 45 départements, 133 arrondissements, 46 communes d'arrondissement,  113 communes de ville and 370 communautés rurales.

References

External links  
 List of administrative divisions in Senegal
 Collectivités locales from Republic of Senegal Government site, l'Agence de l'informatique de l'État (ADIE).
 Map of main subdivisions and more detailed maps on subdivisions
 Décret fixant le ressort territorial et le chef lieu des régions et des départements, décret n°2002-166 du 21 février 2002.
 Code des collectivités locales, Loi n° 96-06 du 22 mars 1996.

 
Senegal
Senegal